Yoğunpelit can refer to:

 Yoğunpelit, Beypazarı
 Yoğunpelit, Yığılca